The Alaska Gold Rush was a gold rush in the Klondike region of the Yukon in Canada from 1896 to 1899.

Alaska Gold Rush may also refer to:

 Nome Gold Rush, a gold rush in Nome, Alaska, approximately 1899–1909
 Fairbanks Gold Rush, a gold rush in Fairbanks, Alaska, in the early 1900s
 Gold Rush: Alaska, a reality television series that airs on Discovery